William Olsen  (born Omaha, Nebraska) is an American poet.

Life
He was raised in Park Forest, Illinois.

His poems and essays have appeared in "Chicago Review, "Crazyhorse", "Gettysburg Review", "The Kenyon Review", "The Nation", The New Republic, Paris Review, "Poetry", "Poetry Northwest", Southern Review,  TriQuarterly'', and elsewhere.  He teaches at Western Michigan University, and the MFA Program at Vermont College.

Awards
 2005 Guggenheim Fellowship  
 Breadloaf Fellowships
 National Endowment of the Arts Creative Writing Fellowship
 Nation/Discovery Award
 The Texas Institute of Arts Award

Works
 
 
"Infinity", Ploughshares, Spring 2004

Editor

Anthologies

References

External links
William Olsen, Poets.org
"The Spirit Behind the Letter", Poetry Santa Cruz
"In Praise of Darkness: An Exchange ", Blackbird, Fall 2007
"Noah Gordon reviews", Jacket 19, October 2002 

Year of birth missing (living people)
Living people
American male poets
Vermont College of Fine Arts faculty
Western Michigan University faculty